Natalia Parés Vives (born 1955) is a chess player and teacher from Spain who holds the chess title of FIDE Master (FM).

She is recognized for being a pioneering openly trans woman in competitive chess.

Competition wins 
Spanish under-20 chess championships runner-up in 1973 and 1975.
Runner-up in 1975 and 1987 of Catalonia Chess Championship.
Runner-up in 2008 Women's Olympiad.
Runner-up in 2008 Catalonia Women's Championship.

Parés Vives represented Spain in the Chess Olympiad in 2008 in Dresden, and in the European Individual Chess Championship in 2009.

References

External 
 
 

1955 births
Living people
Spanish chess players
Spanish female chess players
Chess FIDE Masters
Chess Olympiad competitors
Transgender women